WordWorld, also sometimes referred to as Word World, is an American children's CGI animated television series based on the books and the wooden puzzles of the same name. Created by Don Moody, Jacqueline Moody, Peter Schneider and Gary Friedman, the show was produced by The Learning Box and WTTW National.

WordWorld aired on PBS Kids from September 3, 2007 to January 17, 2011, with PBS later airing reruns on the national 24-hour PBS Kids channel from January 16, 2017 to October 2, 2022. 45 episodes were produced.

Premise
In the series, when letters are combined to spell words, they morph into the shape of the corresponding object. The animal characters and many objects are made of letters, and are respectively called WordFriends and WordThings. The main setting is a planet named WordWorld; despite its name, WordFriends and WordThings also exist in outer space. In each episode, the characters have a cartoonish adventure, and ultimately must "build a word" using synthetic phonics. Some episodes focus on concepts such as rhymes, compound words, and plural formation with -s.

Cast
 H.D. Quinn as the Narrator, Dog, Fly, Duck and Ant
 Lenore Zann as Bear, Kangaroo, Zebra, Owl, and Tiger
 George Bailey as Bug, Monkey, and Pig
 Daryl Ekroth as Frog, Monster, Snail, and Fox
 Mirm Krigel as Bear
 Veronica Taylor as Sheep, Cow, Cat, and Bird
 Marc Thompson as Robot, Bee, Worm, Shark, and Turtle
 Meredith Zeitlin as Fish and Whale

Episodes

Series overview

Season 1 (2007–2008)

Season 2 (2009)

Season 3 (2010–2011)

Reception

Critical
Emily Ashby of Common Sense Media gave the series 5 out of 5 stars; saying that, “This show is perfectly suited for preschoolers' learning level, and it will entertain them as it reinforces their knowledge of letters, sounds, and simple words. With its imaginative design and with the various font styles used to create the letter-based objects, the WordWorld package is delightful enough to draw in parents almost as readily as kids.”

Awards
2009 Emmy Award Winner
Outstanding Children's Animated Program
Outstanding Writing in Animation

2008 Emmy Award Winner
Outstanding Achievement in Main Title

Three 2007 Parents’ Choice Awards: Gold
Welcome to WordWorld DVD
Rocket to the Moon/The Birds DVD
WordWorld Television Series

Creative Child Magazine – Creative Toys Awards
2008 Preferred Choice Award: Barn Bucket Set
2008 Seal of Excellence Award: Pull-Apart Plush

2004 Preferred Choice Award: Pull Apart Plush

2008 Toy Wishes Magazine All-Star Award
WordPuzzle with Sound: Duck's Beach Party

Interactive Media Awards
2007 Best in Class: PBS Kids WordWorld Website

References

External links
 
 

2000s American animated television series
2010s American animated television series
2000s preschool education television series
2010s preschool education television series
2007 American television series debuts
2011 American television series endings
American children's animated comedy television series
American children's animated musical television series
American computer-animated television series
American preschool education television series
American television shows based on children's books
Animated preschool education television series
Daytime Emmy Award for Outstanding Animated Program winners
English-language education television programming
PBS Kids shows
PBS original programming
Reading and literacy television series
Television series by WTTW